ABI gene family member 3 (ABI3) also known as new molecule including SH3 (Nesh) is a protein that in humans is encoded by the ABI3 gene.

Function 

This gene encodes a member of an adaptor protein family. Members of this family encode proteins containing a homeobox homology domain, proline rich region and Src-homology 3 (SH3) domain. The encoded protein inhibits ectopic metastasis of tumor cells as well as cell migration. This may be accomplished through interaction with p21-activated kinases.

References

External links

Further reading